The American Muslims for Palestine (AMP) is an American nonprofit organization founded in 2006.

AMP holds conferences and training sessions for coalition building and legislative advocacy, such as hosting annual Palestine Advocacy Days, that provide workshop panels and encourage attendees to meet with American Congress members. AMP works with Jewish Voice for Peace and IfNotNow to bolster Palestine solidarity campaigns.

History 
AMP was founded in 2006 by Palestinian-American UC Berkeley professor Hatem Bazian, who is also the co-founder of Students for Justice in Palestine. The organization opened its first office in 2009 in Palos Heights, Illinois.

Policy positions 
AMP supports the BDS movement's call for a boycott of Israel in order to put pressure on the country to comply with international law and human rights. The group hopes that a boycott will put an end to the Israeli occupation of the West Bank, grant full equality to Arab Israelis and promote the right of return for the Palestinian refugees. AMP does not take a position on one-state solution or two-state solution as a resolution to the Israeli–Palestinian conflict.

Campaigns 
AMP co-signed a letter with Jewish Voice for Peace (JVP) in 2012 calling on the University of California system to protect student civil liberties from efforts to censor Palestine-related activism.

AMP has organized several billboard and bus advertisement campaigns in New York City and Washington, D.C., to end U.S. foreign aid to Israel. During the 2014 Gaza war, in which over 2,000 Palestinians were killed, it organized protests against Israel's conduct. In 2015, it ran a bus advertisement campaign in advance of Israeli Prime Minister Benjamin Netanyahu's speech to a joint session of Congress calling on members of Congress to boycott the speech.

In December 2016, AMP hosted an event endorsed by 15 other Syrian advocacy and relief organizations in support of the Syrian resistance at Aleppo in the Battle of Aleppo by encouraging attendees to lobby Congress. Later that month, AMP hosted a protest with Council on American–Islamic Relations and JVP calling on  Illinois Governor Bruce Rauner to reverse the moratorium on resettling Syrian refugees.

In 2017, JVP, US Campaign for Palestinian Rights, the social justice movement Code Pink, and AMP organized a letter campaign signed by 32 Democratic congressman urging United States Secretary of State Rex Tillerson to assist Palestinian protester Issa Amro, who was facing criminal chargers in Israel.

During the 2017 Temple Mount crisis, AMP organized a protest called "Aqsa Under Attack" in front of the Israeli embassy in Washington, D.C. During the 2018 Gaza border protests, AMP's local chapter in New Jersey protested outside the offices of Senators Cory Booker and Bob Menendez, calling them to instigate an investigation on Israel using the Leahy Law.

During the 2021 Israel-Palestine conflict, AMP, along with other Muslim advocacy groups, called for a boycott of President Biden's Eid celebration at the White House due to his support of Israel during the conflict.

Reactions
The Anti-Defamation League (ADL) has criticized the AMP for allegedly promoting extreme anti-Israel views and allegedly providing a platform for antisemitism under the guise of educating Americans. In 2013, ADL released a report in which it described AMP as one of the most "influential and active anti-Israel groups" The AMP has said that pro-Israel groups like the ADL deliberately use "false anti-Semitism charges" as a way to limit the free speech, silence political activism, and intimidate vocal pro-Palestinian activists.

Middle East historian Asaf Romirowsky says that it "grew out of the network of Muslim Brotherhood organizations in America" and having an Islamist view on the Israeli–Palestinian conflict.

According to AMP director Kristin Szremski the organization "typically ignores these smear campaigns because they're aimed, in part, to detract us from our work."

A national board member of AMP was prevented entry to Israel as part of an interfaith delegation in 2017. In 2018, Israel officially barred members of AMP from entering Israel due to its support of the BDS movement that calls for a global boycott of Israel.

References

External links
 
 Hatem Bazian
 Creeping Normalcy a.k.a Faithwashing

Advocacy groups in the United States
Civil liberties advocacy groups in the United States
Civil rights movement
Islamic organizations based in the United States
Non-governmental organizations involved in the Israeli–Palestinian conflict
Nonpartisan organizations in the United States
Nonprofit institutes based in the United States
Palestine-related articles by quality
Palestinian solidarity movement